Hélène Noesmoen (born 31 December 1992) is a French windsurfer who competes in the IQFoil class. She won the women's events at the 2021 IQFoil World Championships and the 2020, 2021 and 2022 IQFoil European Championships. Noesmoen also won the RS:X event at the 2018 Sailing World Cup event in Miami, and multiple junior world championships.

Personal life
Noesmoen is from Les Sables-d'Olonne, France. She started windsurfing at a young age, initially with an RS:X. Her father Yves runs  (National School of Sailing and Water Sports), and her two brothers and one sister have also won European windsurfing medals. Noesmoen has a degree in civil and municipal engineering from the US Intelligence and National Security Alliance.

Career
Noesmoen won junior championships in the Techno 293 class in 2007 and 2008, and in the RS:X classification in 2012. She won the women's RS:X competition at the 2018 Sailing World Cup event in Miami. In 2020, she started training in Marseille, where the sailing events at the 2024 Summer Olympics will be held. That year she won the Formula Foil World Championships, and the IQFoil European Championships.

Noesmoen won the 2021 IQFoil World Championships, which was the first time the competition had been held. She also won the 2021 IQFoil European Championships.

In 2022, she won the IQFoil European Championships for the third time. That year, she also won the IQFoil event at the 2022 Mediterranean Games, the Trofeo Princesa Sofia competition, the Garda Trentino Olympic Week event,  and the Semaine Olympique Française La Rochelle competition. Going into the IQFoil World Championships event in Brest, France, Noesmoen was unbeaten in 2022. She finished 15th in the championships, and did not win any individual events.

References

External links
 

1992 births
Living people
French windsurfers
French female sailors (sport)
People from Les Sables-d'Olonne
Sportspeople from Vendée
21st-century French women